Peganum nigellastrum (Chinese: 骆驼蒿, luo tuo hao) is a plant species in the genus Peganum. "Peganum nigellastrum is distributed in China (west and west north of Pekin) and east Siberia (near Khyagt village). This species
has also been recorded in the subprovinces of Mongolia and Tsinhai"  and is found in the Hami region, a prefecture-level city, of Xinjiang Uygur Autonomous Region, China.

Biochemistry

The plant contains phytochemicals:

Canthin-6-one alkaloids: 
Luotonin C 
Luotonin D
Phenylpropanoids: 
Dihydrosinapyl ferulate 
Dihydroconiferyl ferulate
In aerial parts:
Other alkaloids: 
Harmine
3-phenylquinoline, 
3-(4-hydroxyphenyl)quinoline and 
3-(1H-indol-3-yl)quinoline

Dispersal

Peganum nigellastrum is stoloniferous and grows in patches from 100 to 200 m wide. Seeds are dispersed by wind, a form of dispersal known as anemochory and by humans in steppe, forest-steppe habitats; around cities and can be dispersed at least 300 km away from desert steppe by human activities.

References

External links

Nitrariaceae
Plants described in 1835
Flora of China
Taxa named by Alexander von Bunge